The Great Mosque of Toulouse is a mosque in the French city of Toulouse. It opened in 2018.

The mosque is located in the Empalot neighbourhood in the south of the city and has a capacity of 3,000. The funds for the €6 million project came mainly from a 13-year campaign by the nearby Al-Nour Mosque, itself established in 1989. Additions came from the French state, Algeria (€213,000) and Kuwait (€131,000). The imam, Mohamed Tataï, turned down donations from Libyan leader Muammar Gaddafi in 2006 and 2007.

The building has three prayer halls, one of which is reserved for women, and a Quranic school. It is decorated with Tunisian marble, rugs and doors from Turkey, Egyptian chandeliers and Moroccan stucco. On the exterior, there is a gilded dome and a minaret. The architect was Christian Barthe.

References

Toulouse
Buildings and structures in Toulouse
Buildings and structures completed in 2018
21st-century architecture in France